São Jorge Airport  is the only airport of the island of São Jorge, situated in the civil parish of Santo Amaro, municipality of Velas in the Azores.

Airlines and destinations
The following airlines operate regular scheduled and charter flights at São Jorge Airport:

Statistics

See also
List of airports in Portugal
Transport in Portugal
Aviation in the Azores

References

Airports in the Azores
Buildings and structures in Velas